The year 1858 in science and technology involved some significant events, listed below.

Archaeology
 In Luxor, Egypt, the Rhind papyrus is found (named for Alexander Henry Rhind, the discoverer); it is sometimes called the Ahmes papyrus for the scribe who wrote it around 1650 BC.

Astronomy
 Donati's Comet, the first comet to be photographed, is discovered by Giovanni Battista Donati on 2 June and remains visible for several months afterwards.

Biology
 William Herschel initiates fingerprinting as a means of identification, in Bengal.
 Rudolf Virchow publishes Die Cellularpathologie in ihrer Begründung auf physiologische und pathologische Gewebelehre: 20 Vorlesungen, gehalten während der Monate Februar, März und April 1858 im Pathologischen Institut zu Berlin.
 George Bentham's Handbook of the British flora is published. This will be in use (in editions edited by Joseph Dalton Hooker) for a century.

Evolution
 Publication of Darwin's theory:
 June 18 – Charles Darwin receives papers from Alfred Russel Wallace setting out the latter's theory of natural selection which he forwards to Charles Lyell.
 July 1 – Darwin and Wallace's papers on their theories of evolution, On the Tendency of Species to form Varieties; and on the Perpetuation of Varieties and Species by Natural Means of Selection (submitted with the support of Lyell and Joseph Dalton Hooker) are read by John Joseph Bennett to a meeting of the Linnean Society of London. They are first published on August 20.

Exploration
 February 13 – Richard Francis Burton and John Hanning Speke become the first Europeans to discover Lake Tanganyika.
 May 14 – Dr David Livingstone's 6-year Second Zambesi Expedition, under the patronage of the Royal Geographical Society, arrives at the African coast with the prefabricated iron paddle steamer Ma Robert.
 August 3 – John Hanning Speke discovers Lake Victoria, source of the River Nile.

Mathematics
 The Möbius strip is discovered independently by German mathematicians August Ferdinand Möbius and Johann Benedict Listing.
 Arthur Cayley publishes "A memoir on the theory of matrices", introducing the modern concept of the matrix in mathematics.

Medicine
 August 2 – Medical Act 1858 passed "to Regulate the Qualifications of Practitioners in Medicine and Surgery" in the United Kingdom.
 First publication of Gray's Anatomy.
 Publication in London of Thomas B. Peacock's On Malformations, &c., of the Human Heart, with original cases which becomes a standard cardiology textbook.
 French pediatrician Eugène Bouchut develops a new technique for non-surgical orotracheal intubation to bypass laryngeal obstruction resulting from a diphtheria-related pseudomembrane.

Psychiatry
 First treatise on postpartum psychiatric disturbances, by Louis-Victor Marcé, MD.

Technology
 January 31 – I. K. Brunel's , the largest ship built to date, is launched on the River Thames using Tangye hydraulic rams.
 August – The first aerial photography is carried out by Nadar from a moored balloon in France using the collodion process.
 Hoffmann kiln patented in Germany by Friedrich Hoffmann for continuous production brickmaking.

Awards
 Copley Medal: Charles Lyell
 Wollaston Medal for geology: James Hall

Births
 January 2 – Bernard Sachs (died 1944), American neurologist.
 January 9 – Elizabeth Gertrude Britton, née Knight (died 1934), American botanist.
 January 28 – Eugène Dubois (died 1940), Dutch paleoanthropologist.
 February 7 – Herman Frederik Carel ten Kate (died 1931), Dutch anthropologist.
 March 18 – Rudolf Diesel (died 1913), German mechanical engineer.
 March 27 – Richard Friedrich Johannes Pfeiffer (died 1945), German physician and bacteriologist.
 April 23 – Max Planck (died 1947), German theoretical physicist.
 May 19 – Thomas Allinson (died 1918), English physician and dietetic reformer.
 May 28 – T. H. E. C. Espin (died 1934), English astronomer, scientist and clergyman.
 July 9 – Franz Boas (died 1942), German-born anthropologist.
 August 11 – Christiaan Eijkman (died 1930), Dutch physiologist.
 August 19 – Ellen Willmott (died 1934), English horticulturist.
 August 27 – Giuseppe Peano (died 1932), Italian mathematician.
 October 4 – Mihajlo Idvorski Pupin (died 1935), Banat-born physicist.
 November 1 – Ludwig Struve (died 1920), Russian astronomer.
 November 30 – Jagadish Chandra Bose (died 1937), Bengali physicist.
 Laura Forster (died 1917), Australian physician.

Deaths
 April 28 – Johannes Peter Müller (born 1801), German physiologist.
 June 10 – Robert Brown (born 1773), Scottish botanist.
 June 28 – Jane Marcet (born 1769), British popular science writer.
 November 8 – George Peacock (born 1791), English mathematician.
 December 10 – Joseph Paul Gaimard (born 1793), French naval surgeon and naturalist.
 December 16 – Richard Bright (born 1789), English physician.
 date unknown – Amelia Griffiths (born 1768), British phycologist.

References

 
19th century in science
1850s in science